Bryan Scott Corey (born October 21, 1973) is an American former professional baseball right-handed relief pitcher who played in Major League Baseball (MLB), Nippon Professional Baseball (NPB), the KBO League, and the Chinese Professional Baseball League (CPBL) during his career. He is currently a pitching coach in the Oakland Athletics minor league organization.

Career

Playing career
Corey would make his Major League Baseball debut with the Arizona Diamondbacks after being selected 63rd in the expansion draft.

In addition, he pitched in the Japan Central League with the Yomiuri Giants in 2004.

On June 19, 2006, Corey had his contract purchased by the Texas Rangers to pitch in the bullpen, but was designated for assignment by the Rangers on July 25, 2006, after posting a 1–1 record with an ERA of 2.60. On July 30, 2006, Corey was traded to the Red Sox for minor league pitcher Luis Mendoza, but he was again designated for assignment after pitching 1 inning for the Red Sox, giving up a solo home run. He returned to the Red Sox for spring training in 2007 and went 0–1 with a 1.50 ERA in 12 innings, but was not selected to be part of the 25-man roster. However, he was called up on September 1 when rosters expanded. On April 14, 2008, Corey was again designated for assignment by the Red Sox. On April 17, Corey declined an outright assignment to Triple-A and became a free agent. On April 22, 2008, Corey resigned with the Red Sox to a minor league contract. On April 25, 2008, the Red Sox purchased his contract from the Triple-A Pawtucket. He was once again designated for assignment on April 29. On May 11, 2008, Corey was traded to the San Diego Padres for a PTBNL or cash considerations. He became a free agent at the end of the season and signed a minor league contract with the Texas Rangers in February .

Coaching career
In 2017, Corey served as the pitching coach for the Oakland Athletics' Vermont Lake Monsters of the Class A Short Season New York–Penn League. He was promoted to the same position with their Class A-Advanced California League Stockton Ports for 2018.

References

External links

Career statistics and player information from Korea Baseball Organization

1973 births
Living people
Albuquerque Isotopes players
American expatriate baseball players in Japan
American expatriate baseball players in Mexico
American expatriate baseball players in South Korea
American expatriate baseball players in Taiwan
Arizona Diamondbacks players
Baseball players from California
Boston Red Sox players
Bristol Tigers players
Camden Riversharks players
Cleveland Indians scouts
Chiba Lotte Marines players
Diablos Rojos del México players
Fayetteville Generals players
Frisco RoughRiders players
Iowa Cubs players
Jamestown Jammers players
Jacksonville Suns players
KBO League pitchers
Lamigo Monkeys players
LAPC Brahma Bulls baseball players
Las Vegas 51s players
Los Angeles Dodgers players
Lotte Giants players
Major League Baseball pitchers
Mexican League baseball pitchers
Milwaukee Brewers scouts
Minor league baseball coaches
Nippon Professional Baseball pitchers
Oklahoma City RedHawks players
Oklahoma RedHawks players
Pawtucket Red Sox players
People from Thousand Oaks, California
Portland Beavers players
Sacramento River Cats players
San Diego Padres players
Sportspeople from Ventura County, California
Texas Rangers players
Tucson Sidewinders players
Toledo Mud Hens players
Yomiuri Giants players